"Do I Need a Reason" is a song originally by Norwegian band D'Sound, released as a single in 2003, from their fourth album Doublehearted. It was recorded in 2012 by British-Norwegian boyband A1 together with D'Sound and released as a single to promote the concert of both bands.

Background
In February 2012, boyband A1 met with Norwegian band D'Sound to have a jam session and talk about the possibility of collaborating at some point. After performing some unplugged renditions of each other's songs like "Don't Wanna Lose You Again" and "Talkin' Talk", the two bands held a one off special concert at Rockefeller in Oslo, Norway, entitled "Unplugged" on 2 June 2012.

Music video
Despite no music video officially being created, there are videos on YouTube of the two bands performing some unplugged renditions of each other's songs.

Track listing
 Digital download
 "Do I Need a Reason" - 3:51

References

2003 singles
2012 singles
D'Sound songs
A1 (band) songs
2003 songs